Paracles sericea is a moth of the subfamily Arctiinae first described by Schaus in 1896. It is found in Brazil.

Subspecies
Paracles sericea sericea (Brazil)
Paracles sericea romani (Bryk, 1953) (Brazil)

References

Moths described in 1896
Paracles